Apple Canyon Lake is a census-designated place in Jo Daviess County, Illinois, United States. Its population was 558 as of the 2010 census.

Demographics

History 
Apple Canyon Lake is a planned vacation community developed in the late 1960s by the Branigar Organization of Medinah, Illinois. Branigar had developed similar vacation home projects in Wisconsin: Dutch Hollow Lake and Lake Redstone where Branigar built a dam along a stream and then sold water front vacation lots. An interesting aspect of the development is that 85 percent of the 15 miles of shore line is unsubdivided and is to remain green space. This provides lake access to those lots not on the shoreline. In addition, the main road is set back from the lake with lots accessible via cul de sacs.

In the summer of 1969, Branigar began constructing the Apple Canyon Lake dam which would ultimately create a 400-acre lake with an average depth of 40 feet. In addition, a club house, pool, golf course, marina and private airport were built in order to attract potential lot buyers. By the fall of 1969, Branigar was heavily marketing the Apple Canyon Lake vacation lots in the Chicago market. Lot prices ranged from $12,000 to $34,000 in 1969.

Education
The Scales Mound Community Unit School District 211 operates public schools serving the community: Scales Mound Elementary School, Scales Mound Junior High School, and Scales Mound High School.

Other sections are served by Warren and Stockton school districts.

References

Census-designated places in Jo Daviess County, Illinois
Census-designated places in Illinois
Populated places established in the 1960s